Herrera is a Spanish municipality located in the province of Seville, in Andalusia. It has a population of 6526 (as of 2012) and an area of 53,48 km². It is 120 km from the provincial capital, Seville. It is located at a crossroads in the geographical center of Andalusia, less than an hour from provincial capitals such as Córdoba, Málaga and Seville, and just over an hour from Granada. Its name is derived from the Latin inscriptions on the shield: Populus (village), Natus (born), Ignique (fire), Ferro (and iron).

Patrimony and monuments

Municipal Museum
Ancient Medicine, Science and Archaeology: This important museum, unique in its kind in Andalusia, presents an extensive and valuable collection of tools and materials, used since ancient times in medicine and surgery. More than 700 pieces of all kinds dating from the second century B.C. are exposed in a large room.  Another significant amount of equipment: medicines, tools, flasks, books, brochures and billboards, etc., of a more or less recent past, is accurately described in didactic information panels. In another room, visitors are shown an interesting collections of fossils, stuffed animals, butterflies, various insects, etc. This room contains the Archaeology section, with abundant ceramic, stone, bone and metallic material from all ancient cultures of Andalusia.

Arab Fort of Alhonoz
The meaning of the word Alhonoz apparently is "the last bastion" or "the final frontier". This name first appears in the administrative divisions that were created by Arabs, and the first boundary marking conducted between Ecija and Estepa. During the rule of the Emirs, access to Córdoba was flanked, at intervals, by mid-sized and small castles that served as defensive bases for armed defense patrols catering for security for all its length, keeping these roads free of robbers and other dangerous people.  This is the origin of the Arab fortress Alhonoz that would be in connection with the Road of Al-Rasif and other roads that connected Córdoba, Écija and Mediterranean coasts. The Road of Al-Rasif and its ramifications, allowing communication with the Strait Córdoba and continuous contact with Morocco, was the main base for Emirate relationships with the outside world and the best guarantee of their defense, since in the area there were many African Berbers. When Córdoba lost temporarily control over these roads, it was then appreciated what they had meant to her greatness and power. This  transient loss of dominance by the Emirate of Córdoba of the roads came with the Spanish-Berber uprising.  Omar Ben Hafsun, a native of the region of Iznate, in order to prevent abuse and persecution by the Arab element, renounced his Christian beliefs and embraced Islam.

Archaeological sites

In Herrera, Iberian remains are found of Romans and Arabs. On the outskirts of the town, towards Estepa, there is Thermal Set Herrera. It is a large Roman villa where several marble pools, space heating furnaces, and seven large-scale mosaics, including one with a pugilistic scene, were uncovered. Large numbers of paintings and amounts of marble are evident. Other important towns are located in the Arroyo del Padrón, Noriega, Palominas and The Farms of Alonso, the latter of great importance for materials since ancient times. In its vicinity is the river Genil (formerly Singilis), whose nearest peak hosts an Arab fortress. This also explains one of the Roman inscriptions appearing at the end of Herrera that mentions Singiliensis pagus or "Genil payment". In total, the municipality of this town has about ninety archaeological fields, ranging from the Late Bronze Age to the Arab period.

Church Santiago El Mayor
The church parish was founded in 1657, and remodeled in 1780. Highlighted is its great dome and eighteenth century Baroque altarpiece, in which is worshiped the image of the holder. Images include that of a crucifixion around 1600, a clothed image of the Virgin of Sorrows of the Grenadina School, eighteenth century, Jesus of Nazareth carved by Castillo Lastruci of Seville, and Resurrected Christ by renowned sculptor Francisco Buiza.   A beautiful image of the Virgin of Hope, a work by Castillo Lastruci, and a Virgin of the Rosary, from the Convent of the Filipensas in Écija, have been acquired by other Brotherhoods.

Church La Concepción
Construction work of the chapel began around 1732. In 1746 it was covered and blessed and Mass officiated in it, and by the end of 1749 had  been completed with the auction of a belfry tower in which are placed two bells, known in ancient times, in the village, as "the fat women" and "the girl". The work of the chapel was financed by donations from the people of Herrera. Located at Plaza Muñoz Olive, in 1936 it was looted, as was the parish. It consists of two naves covered by a barrel vault, lunettes and copulitas. The images that are venerated here are: Heart of Jesus, Immaculate, Virgin of Carmen, Virgin of the Pillar, Miraculous Virgin, Mary Helper of Christians, Saint Joseph, Saint Rita and Sweet Name of Jesus,  all works in series and mostly uninteresting, except the Immaculate, dated from the 17th Century, which was brought to Herrera by Don Antonio Tineo Lara. The baptismal font is very simple. At the base it reads: Year 1692. It comes from the parish. The chalice used in this church was donated by the Countess of Santa Teresa, Dona Teresa Cepeda Mayor. At the foot of the altar, under its slab, there is a headstone with the following inscription: "These two graves are of Don Bartolomé García del Campo and Calderon and Ms. Catherine Muñoz Almagro Montero and Noe and their heirs. Dun Mortui Sint. Requiescant In Pace. 1748". Under the little pillar of holy water, there is a grave of Mrs Isabel Calderon, widow of D. Francisco Lopez Carrillo, who is also buried there: "so that any person who enters, in said church, and steps on my grave, may disperse the holy water. Year of 1770". In 1929 a clock that was purchased by the City from the Valencia Brothers Roses house was attached to the belfry tower. It was paid in quarterly installments of 750 pesetas with a total price of 6,000 pesetas, with Onsolve Fernando Calvo as the first timekeeper. Since the late nineteenth century within the parish of Santiago there had been another official Herrera timekeeper clock with Bascón Fernando Valdes, who was timekeeper until 1909, continuing in 1910, Rafael Carmona Muñoz to 1929.

Fireplace of Prograsa
Constructed more recently than most of the remaining heritage, it is still part of the charisma and personality of the people. Built in 1961, its height exceeds 27 meters and the material with which it was built is indigenous. The bricks were manufactured in the tile factories in the town and the master builder who was involved in its construction was a neighbor of Herrera, Francisco Muñoz Moreno "Curro Gigante". The fireplace was part of an oil mill that was owned by Ramon Guillén García, who built this factory years ago.

It was subsequently acquired by the company "Prograsa", and then transferred to other companies. This factory was very important to the local economy since more than 200 people worked there. It is noteworthy that in its last stage of operation the oil was manufactured in compliance with Kosher style food preparation, according to the requirements of Jewish Law, the manufacturing process being overseen by a rabbi.

This building is the symbol of the industrialization of Herrera, and essential to secure the population in the municipality as between the years 1949 and 1960, 3,000 herrereños emigrated from the area, and after this industrial launch the population stabilized. Currently, the area in which it is located is popularly called Prograsa and around the fireplace are homes, shops and a park with outdoor activities and entertainment areas.

Revelry

Carnival
This village in the province of Seville has always celebrated the Carnival. The extensive schedule allows everyone participating to wear their costumes, under the watchful eye of herrereños locals who congregate on the sidewalks, balconies and windows. On the doorstep of the City is installed a makeshift walkway where participants parade. The day is ended with a crowded dance attended by most of the inhabitants of Herrera. Also, a week before the parade, wearing costumes typical of this feast, members of "Estudiantina" (troupe of Herrera) perform their songs, many of them with gifts of humorous anecdotes that occurred in the town throughout the year and touches of national news.

Day of Andalusia
This day is celebrated throughout Andalusia and has a unique way of being celebrated in Herrera. The local residents flock to the Place of Andalusia, with a gathering of about 1700 people participating in this celebration, tasting culinary products, beverages, and enjoying several musical performances. All related to Herrera and Andalusian.

Passion Week
If you can describe the Semana Santa of Herrera, it is that of uniqueness. This Passion Week gathering brings together many influences and so that has become unique, charismatic and native. It keeps the spirit of the Passion Bible. Therein lies its uniqueness, as the procession (unlike as happens in many other places) becomes a true biblical representation in the street, as an example, the performances of "Arrest", "The Sacrifice of Isaac", "Crossing spears","Three falls". Formerly represented "The Descent", staging lost in the Brotherhood involved Ntra.Sra. Servite of Sorrows, Las Marias (which originally belonged to that fraternity) and an image holder Servidad Brotherhood articulating a recumbent Christ.

San Marcos
On April 25, the inhabitants of this town move to different spots to enjoy a picnic day. It is time for gazpacho, tortillas, paella and endless culinary delights everyone will taste. It may seem strange, being a Local Party in honor of San Marcos, that there is no procession that day with any image alluding to that Saint. "Tie the Devil", a tradition that consists of joining two "jaramagos" symbolizing the expulsion of all evil, is the last act that takes place on this day.

Pilgrimage in honor to Ntra. Sra. Del Rosario de Fátima
The second Sunday in May, is celebrated Pilgrimage in honor of Our Lady of the Rosary of Fatima. From early in the morning a hundred floats, decorated for the occasion, are driven to the Square of Spain and are concentrated in the town square where the Rosary will be recited and subsequently Mass Rociera which is attended by virtually the entire neighborhood. After the Mass Rociera, where previously the coach has placed the image of Our Lady of the Rosary of Fatima, began its journey to the exhibition of "The Carrizosas", place where about six thousand people concentrate. Hundreds of people make the walk, others on the floats towed by tractors, and horse-drawn carriages, including horsemen and horsewomen who escort a few people making pilgrimages to the aforementioned field. There are also those who come with their own cars laden with delicacies, set for a long day. The arrival of the Virgin to the site is advertised through the ringing of the bells of a chapel that was built years ago for this occasion. Sing, dance, talks, and a varied selection of cuisine: gazpacho majao (traditionally made), other dishes like picadillo, paella and grilled meats are all present.

This celebration is the most requested by tourists along with Semana Santa and Fair.

Corpus Christi
Held in June. It stands out as it passes through Roldan Street, decorated for the occasion with Catholic paintings.

Verbena de San Juan
Held on the penultimate weekend of June (Friday, Saturday and Sunday) trying to match, if possible, the day of San Juan with any of these. Municipal Park "Luis de la Señá María" is considered one of the best fairgrounds around. The trees, gardens and streets of albero manage to attract an audience. The "Velá de San Juan" was formerly held in the town square with a stand-alone booth, plus several attractions. Public and private booths welcome Herrera people enthusiastically enjoying their "Velá de San Juan". Carriages, horses, attractions and performances in the Booth Hall put a festive note in the evening.

Fair of Herrera
The end of the Fair is always the second Sunday of August, starting on the Wednesday of this week. The Flamenco Festival poster "Pedro de la Timotea" announces the first day of the fair, leading figures of singing and dancing come together in this town. Considered by all who have had the opportunity to visit, one of the most prestigious of the region, to which come herrereños who had to emigrate and for good reason do not want to miss the Fair in their hometown. Municipal Park, a venue that has leafy trees, gardens and streets of albero, invites the showcasing of any event. Over sixty booths, between private and public, are installed to hold the Fair of Herrera. The prevailing midday heat does not prevent one from coming to the fair and enjoying the atmosphere. A good handmade gazpacho, typical tapas, a prelude to a delicious meal, provides the audience the satisfaction of enjoying the fair. With the passing of the years, the Fair is gaining in midday splendor. They say for those who live it more intensely that the atmosphere is totally different: ribbon races on horseback, gathering, preparing a good meal: for example a good gazpacho made by hand with local produce including pure oil olive, visit booths where you share the wine of the land, even carefree disregard of the costumes for the occasion, after eating, singing and dancing, a date with sports, Football Trophy "Villa de Herrera" leads to the Municipal Stadium to support our team.

There are those who prefer to enjoy a dressage show held in a room adjacent to the fair. Mackerel, horse riders and cars, decorated for the occasion, walking down Main Street to the fairgrounds, giving more brilliance to the fair during noon. At night, the temperature is suitable for walks, to buy from the stalls that have been placed for this occasion, to wander in the various attractions, all before returning to delve into the magic of the Herrera Fair. The first actions for both herrereños and people coming from surrounding villages is to come to the Booth Hall. Young herrereños are proud of their Fair, the booth that the Youth Delegation stood up for them, so you can share your leisure time between this booth and the Municipal, get up early the next morning the two booths become a hive of people coming from all over after dinner, and many hours of dancing, herrereños travelling to one of the bars where you can have a good chocolate accompanied by a wheel "jeringos" to regain strength. Finally, on Sunday, as in all the fairs, a set of fireworks lights up the herrereño sky announcing the end of it.

Medieval Market
The old town (Barribalto) is the stage for a return to the past where herrereños participate, either by incorporating their business, their welcoming spirit or their desire to have fun during one of the weekends in the October Herrera Medieval Market. Around the Parish of Santiago El Mayor and its square, a large number of taverns, inns and populate craft stalls with their products, the streets allowing visitors to move a few centuries back in time. Among the activities that have been conducted over the years and can be found in the Medieval Market include exhibitions of handicrafts made by local artisans, the parades, the tasting concoctions, crafts workshops, displays of fireworks, juggling, theater and belly dancing as well as activities for children, such as storytelling and face painting.

References

External links
 Ayuntamiento de Herrera 
 Herrera at the Instituto de Estadística de Andalucía 

Municipalities of the Province of Seville